Dr. György Jánosi (born Szekszárd, 21 January 1954) is a Hungarian Socialist politician. He served as Minister of Youth Affairs and Sports between 2002 and 2003. He was followed by Ferenc Gyurcsány who later became Prime Minister. György Jánosi was the Chairman of the National Assembly of Hungary's Committee of Education between 1996 and 2010.

Personal life
He is married. His wife is Rozália Jánosiné Kühstahler. They have two daughters, Eszter and Kata.

References 

 Biography

1954 births
Living people
People from Szekszárd
Hungarian Socialist Party politicians
Government ministers of Hungary
Members of the National Assembly of Hungary (1990–1994)
Members of the National Assembly of Hungary (1994–1998)
Members of the National Assembly of Hungary (1998–2002)
Members of the National Assembly of Hungary (2002–2006)
Members of the National Assembly of Hungary (2006–2010)